Mann Kee Awaaz Pratigya 2 is an Indian drama television series that premiered from 15 March on Star Bharat. It was a sequel to the 2009 series Mann Kee Awaaz Pratigya which aired on Star Plus. Produced by Rajan Shahi under Director's Kut Productions, it starred Pooja Gor and Arhaan Behll. The series went off air due to low TRP ratings and overhaul of the main storyline.

Plot 
Nine years have passed, and Pratigya is now an established public prosecutor of Allahabad. The Singh family has now given up all criminal activities and lead a happy and content life. Shakti's sons, Samar and Girish, are fiercely jealous of Garv. They lock him in a car, which loses control and accidentally hits the young son of Balwant Tyagi. Balwant Tyagi is the most powerful man ‘Bahubali’ of Haryana. Garv tells Krishna, but both hide it from Pratigya. Profoundly grieved by his son's demise, Balwant seeks revenge from those who killed his son. Balwant hires Pratigya as a prosecutor to fight the legal battle of his son's death. Elsewhere, Krishna hides the truth from the family and tries to destroy all the evidence which can pose a threat for Garv.

Balwant feels restless when Pratigya fails to collect evidence and spoils her Holi celebration. Sajjan Singh confronts Balwant and asks him to stay within his limits. On the other hand, Krishna's friend Aadarsh is introduced, who will fall in love with Komal. Krishna spikes Pratigya's drink and makes her utter pivotal information. Later, Krishna makes one of his accomplices take the entire blame on himself, but this plan fails.

Further, Balwant frames Shakti in charge of his son's murder. Soon, Pratigya learns about Garv's accident and tells the family they made a mistake hiding it as it is an accident and not a murder. Krishna believes Pratigya after she swears on Garv that nothing will happen to the latter. Later, Pratigya, Krishna and Garv go to the court and tell them about Garv. The judge then tells Pratigya that it was treated as an accident since he is only seven years old.

Nevertheless, Krishna would be arrested for a short time for tampering with evidence. While he is arrested and bids goodbye to Pratigya and his family, Komal slaps Pratigya and blames her for her husband's arrest. Soon Sajjan is told that Krishna is in hospital. They go to the hospital, and Krishna is saved.

After some days, Krishna is discharged from the hospital, and Singhs decide to go to a farmhouse so that Krishna recovers fastly. Thakurain weaves a plan with Komal to throw Pratigya out of Singh mansion. She poisons Pratigya's juice. A new girl Meera is introduced. On the other hand, Pratigya's health is constantly deteriorating. During her anniversary, she falls. When she consulted Doctors about it, they informed her that she has blood cancer and will die soon.

On the other hand, Meera starts to have a feeling for Krishna. On the advice of Thakurain, Pratigya starts searching for a good wife for Krishna and a mother for her children. Thakurain discovers Komal's love for Aadarsh and makes a plan to separate Komal and Aadarsh as well as Krishna and Pratigya. Pratigya informs Aadarsh about her blood cancer, and Thakurain locks Pratigya and Aadarsh in a room as per her plan. Krishna finds Pratigya in Aadarsh's room, and Komal was about to slap Pratigya. Still, he stopped her and said that he believes her more than himself and leaves, whereas Komal threatens Thakurain to reveal to Krishna that Thakurain will poison Pratigya if she did not allow her to marry Aadarsh. Meanwhile, Adarsh denies love for Komal to her.

Moreover, Pratigya and Aadarh marry each other, and Pratigya refers to Krishna as an uneducated goon. Krishna promises Pratigya to hate her forever, burns her belongings, and marries Meera to make Pratigya jealous. It is revealed in the reports that Pratigya does not have cancer, and Thakurain is giving her poison. Krishna learns of it, breaks all relationships with Thakurain, and leaves with Pratigya. On the road, they face a dangerous accident. Pratigya is assumed to be dead by everyone.

18 months later
Krishna has lost his memory, and he resides with the Singhs. It is revealed that Sumitra and Sajjan only rescued Krishna from the accident and left Pratigya and that Sumitra and Sajjan made Krishna believe that Meera is his wife. However, Pratigya was rescued by an orphanage, and she was in a coma. However, she learns the truth. She tries various methods to regain Krishna's memory, but in vain. After weeks of effort, Pratigya meets Meera, expecting her to understand. However, she refuses to give back her place to Pratigya and goes away. Appalled, Pratigya comes face-to-face with the Singhs, shocking them all. They soon reveal how they have wanted to kill her since she sent Krishna to jail. Sumitra and Sajjan reveal that they left her to die on the roads, and they wanted Meera to become the daughter-in-law. Pratigya records them admitting the truth of their plan and told them that she would not expose them but instead, she will counter by regaining Krishna's memory. Due to Sumitra's instigation, Meera begins to dislike Pratigya, believing that Pratigya abandoned Krishna. Singhs arranged for the marriage of Krishna and Meera, but Krishna becomes during the wedding. The doctor says that Krishna's memory is returning. After many tries finally on the occasion of Krishna's Birthday Krishna's memory comes back. Krishna was about to leave his family but due to heart attack to Sajjan Singh he has to live with them, it is revealed that Meera is pregnant with Krishna's child. Meera slips and her child miscarriages. On the other hand, Shakti tries to molest Meera and gets caught by Krishna causing the latter throws him out of the house. Shakti kidnaps Kriti later to take revenge from Krishna. However, just in time, with no other option, Kesar shoots Shakti in the back to save Kriti, causing him to die. When his body is taken to the Singh House, Sumitra curses all of them and blames Pratigya for being the mastermind behind the murder. Samar arrives home, at mourning time and angry Sumitra decides to Sharad of krishna too. Meera bids goodbye after getting a job in the city. Later Kesar arrives home after relief from jail. Sumitra does not allow her to enter and tries to burn her but is stopped. Samar and Sumitra decide to take revenge form Pratigya and Kesar and they start evil plans against Garv and Kriti. Soon afterwards Samar realises his mistakes and stops supporting Sumitra and becomes a positive character. Sumitra is arrested and the rest of the family hug each other with a happy ending.

Cast

Main
 Pooja Gor as Pratigya Singh – Krishna's wife; Kriti and Garv's mother; Samar and Girish's aunt
 Arhaan Behll as Krishna Singh – Sajjan and Sumitra's younger son; Shakti and Komal's brother; Pratigya's husband; Kriti and Garv's father; Samar and Girish's uncle

Recurring
 Anupam Shyam as Sajjan Singh – Sumitra's husband; Shakti, Krishna and Komal's father; Samar, Girish, Kriti and Garv's grandfather
 Asmita Sharma as Sumitra Singh – Sajjan's wife; Shakti, Krishna and Komal's mother; Samar, Girish, Kriti and Garv's grandmother
 Bhumika Gurung / Tina Philip as Meera – Krishna's fake wife
 Sachal Tyagi as Shakti Singh – Sajjan and Sumitra's elder son; Krishna and Komal's brother; Kesar's husband; Samar and Girish's father (dead)
 Aalika Sheikh as Kesar Singh – Shakti's widow; Samar and Girish's mother
 Parvati Sehgal as Komal Singh Yadav – Sajjan and Sumitra's daughter; Shakti and Krishna's sister; Adarsh's wife
 Shahab Khan as Shyam Saxena, Pratigya, Adarsh and Arushi’s Father, (Cameo) 
 Ashish Kapoor as Adarsh Yadav – Komal's husband
 Prachi Thakur as Kriti Singh – Krishna and Pratigya's daughter; Garv's sister; Samar and Girish's cousin
 Dhruvin Sanghvi as Garv Singh – Krishna and Pratigya's son; Kriti's brother; Samar and Girish's cousin
 Araham Sawant as Samar Singh – Shakti and Kesar's elder son; Girish's brother; Kriti and Garv's cousin
 Gouransh as Girish Singh – Shakti and Kesar's younger son; Samar's brother; Kriti and Garv's cousin
 Naved Raza as Aadesh Tyagi – Balwant and Sushma's son
 Chetan Hansraj as Balwant Tyagi – Dhaara's brother; Sushma's husband; Aadesh's father
 Shivani Gosain as Sushma Tyagi – Balwant's wife; Aadesh's mother
 Athar Siddiqui as Dhara Tyagi – Balwant's brother; Vimla's husband
 Supriya Kumari as Vimla Tyagi – Dhara's wife
 Sima Singh as Lakhpatiya at Sajjan Singh house

Production

Development and premiere
In early 2013, Mann Kee Awaaz Pratigya was confirmed returning with a new season on StarPlus based on story of lead character Pratigya and Krishna's daughters. Neha Marda was hired as a lead and the pilot episode was shot and approved by the channel but the series was dropped when the discussions between the production house and channel stalled.

The reruns of Mann Kee Awaaz Pratigya during the lockdown of COVID-19 were garnering good response on Star Plus which made the channel to bring back the series.
In February 2021, Pratigya 2 was planned and soon confirmed with a return on Star Bharat with a new season for which Pearl Grey stated, "Pratigya Season 2 was supposed to happen right after we wrapped the first season, but it got delayed considerably. Over the years, I kind of gave up hope for Pratigya 2. However, fans and viewers constantly demanded the show's return. The re-runs during the lockdown were much appreciated, and that’s when the channel decided to bring the show back. Merely in a span of a month, the return of the show with season 2 was planned. Everything was discussed and meetings were held, and the rest is history."

Pearl Grey, the writer and producer of the former season collaborated with Rajan Shahi for this season as creative producer. Discussing it, Shahi stated, "DKP in collaboration with Pearl will retain all the best of what worked in season 1, but season 2 will also have surprise packages of new relevance, the story, and also a fresh cast which is being added to the already great, remarkable, and talented cast of season 1."

On 23 February 2021, the production and shooting of the series began in Prayagraj in Uttar Pradesh.

The team had a havan on the sets of series for an auspicious beginning for their new journey before they started shoot in Mumbai.

Release
The first promo of the series was released on 28 February 2021 featuring Pooja Gaur and Anupam Shyam reprising their roles of Pratigya and Thakur Sajjan Singh from the former season.
The next promo released on 12 March 2021 featured Arhaan Behll reprising his role of Krishna Singh from the former season.

Casting
With the release of first promo, Pooja Gaur and late Anupam Shyam were confirmed reprising their roles of Pratigya and Thakur Sajjan Singh from the former season.
Arhaan Behll was also confirmed reprising his role of Krishna Singh from the former series.
Asmita Sharma, Parvati Sehgal and Aalika Sheikh reprise their respective roles of Thakurain, Komal and Kesar from the former season. Sachal Tyagi was cast as Shakti Singh which was earlier played by Jaswant Menaria in the former season.

Supriya Kumari initially auditioned for the role of Chetan Hansraj character's wife but was later cast as Hansraj's brother
Athar Siddiqui's wife.

Filming
Based on the backdrop of Uttar Pradesh, set in Prayagraj, the series is mainly filmed at Film city in Mumbai.

Some of the initial sequences were shot in Prayagraj in Uttar Pradesh in February 2021.

On 13 April 2021, Chief Minister of Maharashtra, Uddhav Thackeray announced a sudden curfew due to increased Covid cases, while the production halted from 14 April 2021. Soon, the team of the series decided to move their shooting location to Silvasa in Dadra and Nagar Haveli until the next hearing.

Reception

Critics
Pinkvilla Mann Ki Awaaz Pratigya 2 will mark Pooja Gor and Arhaan Behll's reunion on the small screen after nine years.

References

External links
 
 Mann Kee Awaaz Pratigya 2 on Hotstar

Indian drama television series
Indian television soap operas
Television series about marriage
Television series about dysfunctional families
Domestic violence in television
Hindi serials focus on violence against women
2021 Indian television series debuts
Star Bharat original programming
Television shows set in Uttar Pradesh